The State Military Scientific-Technical Center "DELTA" (SMSTC Delta) is a legal entity of public law established by the decree of the President of Georgia. Its full name is Legal Entity of Public Law - State Military Scientific-Technical Center "DELTA". The scope of work of the organization is mainly focused on the Defense Industry and to some extent on the Civilian Field. The Center is an organization separate from state governing bodies. Its state control is exercised by the Ministry of Defense of Georgia
The mission of the organization is based on the state interests of Georgia and the national defense strategy. The Center's primary responsibility is to encourage the growth of the domestic military industry. introduction of cutting-edge military technologies in the design, development, and mass production of combat gear and weapons that are in line with global trends. The only company in Georgia involved in the defense industry is State Military Scientific-Technical Center Delta. Today, “DELTA” has both intellectual and technical resources to design and manufacture both military and civilian products.

History 

The history of "Delta" dates back to the 60s, and from the beginning of the 90s the research center was subordinated to the Ministry of Defense of Georgia.  Delta in its current state was formed in 2010, when the center was subordinated to six scientific research institutes and the 31st Tbilisi Aircraft Factory. The scope of work of the organization is mainly focused on the defense industry and to some extent on the civilian industry. The center is an organization separate from state governing bodies. Its state control is exercised by the Ministry of Defense of Georgia.

Functions and scope of activities

 Development, recovery, updating, maintenance and repair of combat weapon, munitions, military equipment and ammunition according to existing legislation of Georgia
 Classification, evaluation of applicability and cost, utilization and realization of expired, unused military equipment, munitions and weapon available in the country
 Processing of explosive agents intended for military and industrial use 
 Design and building of military-industrial objects of special purpose 
 Development of armor materials, scientific-technical support of security systems of manpower and special objects
 Development and production of control and measuring-metrological devices intended for special military-technical equipment and technological processes 
 Development, implementation, recovery, updating, maintenance and repair of optical and electronic devices-machines as well as special-purpose systems and their equipment 
 Design, implementation, maintenance and repair of special security systems of military objects and buildings-constructions
 Processing, recovery, updating, maintenance and repair of military-training simulators 
 Methodological and hardware support of tests on training area
 Acquisition – storage, transportation and realization of explosive agents, weapons, munitions and their elements according to existing legislation of Georgia 
 Coordination and support of humanitarian demining activity;
 Processing, updating, development, implementation and maintenance of systems concerned with avalanche protection and antihail activities in the country;

Scientific institutes and companies entering into STC “Delta”
 Institute “Optics” (Optica);
 Grigol Tsulukidze Mining Institute;
 R. Dvali Machine – Mechanics Institute;
 F. Tavadze Metallurgy and Materials Science Institute;
 Micro and Nano Electronics Institute;
 Ilia Vekua Sokhumi Institute of Physics and Technology

Important Projects

Anti-Hail System

In 2015, the State Military-Scientific-Technical Center "DELTA" installed an anti-hail system in the Kakheti region of Georgia. To protect against hail, 85 Launchers and one meteorological radar station were deployed in Kakheti. They are managed remotely from the central control center. The efficiency of the system is 85-95%, which is achieved by the high level of automation and the use of modern technologies. The anti-hail system has been operating since 2018 by the Center for Active Impact on Natural Events Ltd.

Supply of Georgian Defense Forces with State Produced Ballistic Vests and Helmets

Delta has been supplying the Georgian National Defense Forces with the highest quality personal protective equipment since 2015. Military and special units of the Georgian Defense Forces use MK-I and MK-II type ballistic vests, DH MK-I and DH MK-III military and special use ballistic helmets.

Participation in international military exhibitions

Delta Military Scientific-Technical Center has been participating in international military exhibitions periodically since 1999.
 On October 26–30, 1999, for the first time, Delta presented Georgian-made weapons and equipment abroad at the EXPOMIL-99 International Defense Industry Exhibition in Romania.
 A reorganized Delta presented part of its own products on May 6–8, 2014 at SOFEX 2014, a large-scale international defense industry exhibition in Jordan. Among the exhibits were armored vests, helmets, mortars, RD-7 anti-tank mines and others.
 On November 12–14, 2014, a conference and industrial exhibition IESMA-2014 was held in Vilnius, Lithuania, co-organized by NATO Energy Security Center and LEPL LLC "Delta", where LLC "Delta" was presented with its own display.
 On June 11–15, 2018, the world's largest military exhibition at EUROSATORY, State Military Scientific-Technical Center "DELTA" presented armored vests, helmets, mortars and light weapons Among them, for the first time in history, Delta presented the Georgian armored vehicle DIDGORI, anti-hail systems, at the military exhibition.
 On February 17–21, 2019, at IDEX-2019, the largest exhibition of land, sea and air defense, Delta presented state produced weapons. Among them are three modifications of the armored vehicle "Didgori", personal protection equipment, mortars and light weapons.

Military and civilian production

References

External links
 
 The Legislative Herald of Georgia 
 The Ministry of Defense of Georgia

Defence companies of Georgia (country)
Government agencies of Georgia (country)
Research institutes in Georgia (country)
Military installations of Georgia (country)